Redfield College is an independent Roman Catholic all-boys early learning, primary, and secondary day school, located in Dural, a suburb in the Hills District of Sydney, New South Wales, Australia.

The college was founded in 1986 by the Parents for Education Foundation and provides an education for students from early learning, through Year 2 to Year 12.

Mentoring
Each student is allocated a personal mentor, formerly known as a "tutor" within the school, who meets the student regularly (ideally fortnightly) to check on the student's advancement academically, socially, spiritually, etc. The mentor tends to guide the same student over a period of years, and meets with the parents of the student each term. This system is the same across all the Schools of The PARED Foundation.

Chaplaincy
Redfield College is an independent school. The Chaplains at the college are priests of Opus Dei, a personal prelature of the Catholic Church. Redfield offers daily mass and the Sacrament of Reconciliation to students, parents and teachers as well as other faith-based practises of the Catholic Church. The current chaplains at the college are Fr Phil Elias (Class of 2000) and Fr Frank Garcia.

As of 2023, there have been 11 Redfield Old Boys ordained to the priesthood, including Diocesan, Franciscan, Dominican and Opus Dei priests.

HSC Performance
Although founded in 1986, Redfield's first HSC class was the Class of 1993. Since then Redfield has undertaken the HSC every year and 2023 will mark its 30th HSC cohort. Although the school has a relatively small cohort compared to other schools in NSW, the College has consistently ranked within the top 150 schools for the last 20 years.

Programmes available

Community service
Throughout their schooling lives, Redfield students complete many Community Service Projects, both locally and abroad. In Year 9, boys do a small project that they complete weekly over a year. These include visiting disabled students, nursing homes, and community gardening. In Years 10–12, many Redfield students attend the annual "Vietnam Workcamp", wherein they travel to K'Long Village, near Dalat, Vietnam, to built homes for impoverished families.

Exchange programs 
Redfield has frequently hosted visits from, and sent students to, Mikawadai College in Nagasaki, Japan, and three schools in Spain: Colegio Viaro in Barcelona, Colegio Gaztelueta in Bilbao and Colegio Los Robles in Oviedo. In recent years boys from Monte VI in Montevideo, Uruguay and Colegio Penalba in Valladolid have also visited each year as well as a class of students from Tak Sun College in Hong Kong. Boys are billeted with families.

Sport
Redfield's principal sports include football, rugby union, basketball and cricket.  Redfield's sporting division is affiliated with the IPSHA (Independent Primary School Heads of Australia), ISA  (Independent Sporting Association), and CIS (Combined Independent Schools). Redfield's senior Rugby team (the 1st VX) has won the ISA second division championship six times since joining the ISA in 2006, more than any other school in the Independent Schools Association.

The Redfield First XI won the Second Division Football Championship in its inaugural year in 2012, and won the 2014 and 2015 seasons comprehensively. More recently they won the 2016 and 2017 season.

Co-curricular
Redfield offers the following co-curricular activities:
Junior Voices
Primary Choir
Vocal Ensemble
Schola (Gregorian choir)
Concert Band
Wind Symphony
Debating
Public speaking
Mock trials
Athletics
Swimming
Cross Country
Chess Club
ISA Cricket
ISA Basketball
ISA Football
ISA Rugby
Intramural Chess
Intramural Basketball
Intramural Football
Intramural Cricket
Intramural Touch Football

Headmasters
The following individuals have served as Headmaster of Redfield College.

Notable alumni
The Redfield Old Boys' Association (ROBA) is a network/community of alumni. It has strong rugby union, football and basketball teams.

Notable alumni include:
 Dominic Perrottet, 46th Premier of New South Wales
 Nathaniel Smith, Member for Wollondilly 
 Bernard Foley, Australian professional rugby union player
 Lenny Hayes, former professional Australian rules footballer
 Lachlan McCaffrey, Australian professional rugby union player
 Tim Pocock, actor
 Julian Maroun, actor
 Nic Dolly, professional rugby union player

Four Corners investigation
In January 2023, the ABC program Four Corners investigated Sydney schools associated with Opus Dei (including Redfield), and alleged harmful classroom practices including: "...misinformation about sexual health, homophobia, opposition to consent education and encouraging girls to not get the HPV vaccine...″ and ″...opposing consent education, encouraging students to make decisions contrary to medical advice, harm to students as a result of their education, homophobia and recruitment of students under the guise of pastoral care..."

Interestingly, during Redfield's first Open Day (08/03/2023) since the airing of the Four Corners episode, over 150 people attended - making it the largest Open Day turnout in the history of the school.

See also 

 List of non-government schools in New South Wales
 List of Catholic schools in New South Wales
 Catholic education in Australia

References

External links

Official website
Independent Sporting Association

Educational institutions established in 1986
Catholic primary schools in Sydney
Catholic secondary schools in Sydney
Boys' schools in New South Wales
1986 establishments in Australia
Hornsby Shire